The Hardy Way is a waymarked long-distance footpath in southern England in the United Kingdom.

Length of the Hardy Way

The route runs for 354 km or 220 miles.

The route
The route is named for the writer Thomas Hardy and runs through Thomas Hardy's Wessex, his version of Wessex, the region of the West Country of England portrayed in his books, such as Tess of the d'Urbervilles, The Mayor of Casterbridge, Far From the Madding Crowd, Jude the Obscure and others.

It starts at Higher Bockhampton, where Hardy was born, and finishes at Stinsford churchyard, where Hardy's heart lies buried.

It passes through Dorset and takes in along the route such villages and towns as Bere Regis, Lulworth Cove, Corfe Castle, Shaftesbury, Evershot and the county town, Dorchester.

External links
Walking pages info on the Hardy Way
Walking on the web - route summary

Long-distance footpaths in England
Footpaths in Dorset